Herschel Cellel Loveless (May 5, 1911May 4, 1989) was the 34th Governor of Iowa, from 1957 to 1961. He was also mayor of Ottumwa, Iowa. He was born in 1911 in Hedrick, Iowa and died in 1989 in Winchester, Virginia.

When elected governor in 1956, Loveless was only the fourth Democrat to win Iowa's gubernatorial seat since the Civil War. His ties to Iowa's growing labor movement and the state's urbanization helped to secure his victories in 1956 and 1958. During his years as governor, Loveless focused on issues such as flood control, mental health, and social services. He also promoted reapportionment to help redress the imbalance in rural-versus-urban representation in the state legislature. Loveless helped to align Iowa's Democratic Party more closely with its national counterpart.

He died of lung cancer on May 4, 1989, just one day before his 78th birthday.

Notes

 Harlan Hahn, Urban-Rural Conflict:  The Politics of Change (1971)
 James C. Larew, A Party Reborn: The Democrats of Iowa, 1950-1974 (1980)
 Wilson J. Warren, Struggling with "Iowa's Pride": Labor Relations, Unionism, and Politics in the Rural Midwest since 1877(2000)

External links

National Governors Association

1911 births
1989 deaths
People from Keokuk County, Iowa
People from Ottumwa, Iowa
Mayors of places in Iowa
Democratic Party governors of Iowa
Candidates in the 1960 United States presidential election
Deaths from lung cancer
20th-century American politicians